Rabindranath Tagore University (formerly known as AISECT University) is a premier private university established by All India Society for Electronics and Computer Technology (AISECT) in Raisen, Bhopal, Madhya Pradesh, India. Rabindranath Tagore University is recognised by University Grant Commission and  Government of Madhya Pradesh. It provides academic programmes in graduate, post graduate and research levels in Engineering, Information Technology, Management, Law, Science, Arts, Commerce, Education, Paramedical etc. AISECT Academy for Fire Safety and Security was launched with the support of NAFS– National Academy of Fire and Safety Engineering.India's first skill-based private university, Rabindranath Tagore University strives to impart skill-based quality education and promote research driven advancement of knowledge for creating successful professionals. Established by Rabindranath Tagore University group in 2010, It has carved a niche for itself in Madhya Pradesh and Jharkhand. With strong industry linkages, Rabindranath Tagore University focus lies in the holistic learning and development of a student in order to ensure the effective application of knowledge for a secure future.It is named after Rabindranath Tagore.'''

Academics 
Rabindranath Tagore University offers undergraduate, postgraduate and research programs in academic disciplines classified under different faculties including Engineering & Technology, Science, Arts, Commerce, Management, Law, Education and Paramedical.

Campus 

Rabindranath Tagore University is located in the outskirts of Bhopal – the city of Lakes and the Capital of Madhya Pradesh, the central state of India. The university is about 15 km away from town, in a hilly terrain with a rural back drop, built in 50 acres of lush green self contained campus, operating from wide spread 15 independent building blocks. It has all the convenience and comfort of a cosmopolitan city and also eco friendly and serene environment of rural area. Rabindranath Tagore University is well connected by rail, road and air : 40 km from Airport and 16 km from Railway Station.

Recognition and Awards 
Rabindranath Tagore University is recognised by University Grant Commission (UGC), All India Council for Technical Education (AICTE), National Council for Teacher Education (NCTE), Bar Council of India (BCI), Madhya Pradesh Paramedical Council and Indian Nursing Council (INC). Rabindranath Tagore University is a member of Association of Indian Universities (AIU). Rabindranath Tagore University had received the special mention award in the "Vocational Education and Training" category at the World Education Summit Awards 2013. Rabindranath Tagore University was listed in the rank band of 101 - 150 in the ranking of institutions of higher education in 2019, 2020 and 2021 published by National Institutional Ranking Framework (NIRF) of the Ministry of Education, Government of India.

Atal Incubation Center(AIC-RNTU) 
Atal Innovation Mission is an ambitious flagship program of NITI Aayog. Under its aegis, AIC-RNTU (Atal Incubation Centre, Rabindranath Tagore University supported by NITI Aayog) aims to encourage and promote the culture of entrepreneurship in India. Rabindranath Tagore University was selected as the Atal Incubation Centre by Niti Aayog amongst the 1200 second round applicants. It promises to be the pillar of support for the booming startups in every possible way.

Established in 2018, the center is part of the Atal Innovation Mission, a government initiative aimed at promoting entrepreneurship and innovation across India.

With a focus on technology, healthcare, agriculture, and education, AIC-RNTU offers mentorship, funding, access to market and industry networks, and infrastructure support to startups. The center's affiliation with Rabindranath Tagore University and partnerships with leading organizations further enhance its offerings, helping startups succeed and drive innovation in the region.

To date, AIC-RNTU has supported over 50 startups, including Prachar Bharat and Medimojo. As a significant contributor to the startup ecosystem in Bhopal and central India, AIC-RNTU is helping to shape the future of entrepreneurship and innovation in the country. You can apply for Cohort 2023 13-Week Capacity Building and Incubation Program on a hybrid model. The program is designed to mentor, and handhold early-stage startups to enter the market with full thrust and potential along with aid in raising Pre-seed.
Seed Funding. 3- Days Physical Program and 8 weeks of Virtual Sessions/Workshops developing the conceptual knowledge and strategies; followed by 3 Weeks of One-on-one mentoring sessions with sector-specific mentors.  A Week dedicated to strengthening the Financial terminologies along with creating the financial model (Termsheet, SHA, Investment deal structure etc..) of the startups aiming to make them investment-ready. The cohort will be concluded by a Demo day in front of a mixed pool of investors including Seed Investors, Angel Investors and VCs from different sectors and across the country.

Programs Offered 
Rabindranath Tagore University Bhopal welcomes you with fifteen magnificent buildings in an entirely green campus located between two hills. The panoramic view of the university and the design of the campus are inspired from the ancient universities like Taxshila, Nalanda, and Shantiniketan. The Rabindranath Tagore University also hosts world class infrastructure with experienced faculty, and a respectable placement record. Rabindranath Tagore University is India's first skill-based university with a special focus on practical and research-based learning.

References

External link
 

Private universities in India
Universities in India
Universities in Madhya Pradesh
Universities in Bhopal
Raisen district
2010 establishments in Madhya Pradesh
Educational institutions established in 2010